Hit Mix is a remix compilation album of cantopop singer Prudence Liew, released in May 1988.  Although billed as a remix album, it only contains three remixes of songs from her previous album, Why.  The other songs on this album are two previously unreleased tracks as well as a cover version of What Have I Done to Deserve This? by Pet Shop Boys, a song which Liew has recorded a Cantonese version of.  It was the title track of her last album, Why.

Track listing

References

Prudence Liew albums
1988 remix albums
Sony Music Hong Kong remix albums